A list of films produced in South Korea in 1986:

External links
1986 in South Korea

 1980-1989 at www.koreanfilm.org

1986
South Korean
1986 in South Korea